Kenneth "Ken" L. Spikes (born February 2, 1935, in Cordele, Georgia - died November 16, 2009, in Albany, Georgia) was a driver for the NASCAR Grand National Series who drove from 1964 to 1970. Before he was in NASCAR, Spikes served in the United States Air Force. During his spare time, Spikes would devote his time to operating a company specializing in heavy equipment.

Career
The primary manufacturers for this driver were Chevrolet, Pontiac, and Dodge. While he enjoyed an average start of 31st place; racing skills developed on the track allowed him to improve on his unimpressive starts with an average finish of 26th place. Spikes would earn a grand total of $8,235 from his entire NASCAR driving career ($ when adjusted for inflation). He would fail to qualify for one race only: the 1967 National 500 set in prestigious Charlotte Motor Speedway (Concord, North Carolina).

After retiring from racing, he devoted his life to religion and became a minister. As a faithful church-goer at the Listonia Christian Mission, Spikes knew that he would be attracted to the ministry and became Reverend Ken Spikes. He died at Phoebe Putney Memorial Hospital in Albany, Georgia; leaving behind his wife Miriam (née Dean) along with four daughters, six grandchildren, and five great-grandchildren.

Titles, honours and awards

Shorthand titles
February 2, 1935 – [Exact date unknown]: Mr. Kenneth Spikes
[Exact date unknown] – November 16, 2009: Reverend Kenneth Spikes

References

External links

1935 births
2009 deaths
People from Cordele, Georgia
Racing drivers from Georgia (U.S. state)
NASCAR drivers
United States Air Force airmen
American Christian clergy
20th-century American clergy